ODS may refer to:

Computing, Internet and information technology 
Files-11 (On-Disk Structure), a DEC filesystem
Office of Digital Strategy, Executive Branch of the White House
OpenDocument Spreadsheet file format
Online dating service
Operational data store, an intermediate data warehouse for databases
OpenDNSSEC, a security extension of DNS Protocol
Optical data storage a technology for storing information

Science and technology
Octadecylsilyl, also known as C18, a surface coating used in reversed-phase chromatography
Oxide dispersion strengthened alloys
Ozone-depleting substance, chemicals which contribute to ozone depletion
Osmotic demyelination syndrome, a neurological condition involving severe damage to the myelin sheath of nerve cells

Military operations
Operation Defensive Shield
Operation Desert Storm

Other 
 Civic Democratic Party (Czech Republic) (Czech: Občanská demokratická strana)
 Civic Democratic Party (Slovakia) (Slovak: Občianska demokratická strana)
 Odesa International Airport, an airport in Odesa, Ukraine (IATA code ODS)
 L'Officiel du jeu Scrabble, the reference dictionary for Scrabble in French-speaking countries
 One Day School, a gifted education program in New Zealand.
 Operating Deflection Shape, a method used for visualisation of the vibration pattern of a machine
 Ordbog over det danske Sprog, a dictionary of Danish
 Overdoses (especially drug overdoses)
 In Liverpool in England, Old Dock Sill
 Orbital Dysfunctional Syndrome from the film Pandorum
 Occupy Dame Street, a protest in Dublin, Ireland in 2011–12

See also

 Odds

OD (disambiguation)
odes (disambiguation)